William Martin Schulz (January 12, 1939 – July 22, 2019) was an American conservative journalist and editor. He was an editor of Reader's Digest from 1967 to 2003, and he wrote many articles for Human Events.

Early life
Schulz was born on January 12, 1939, in New York City. He graduated from the Bronx High School of Science and he attended Antioch College for a year but failed to graduate.

Career
Schulz edited Reader's Digest from 1967 to 2003, initially as the senior editor of its Washington bureau and later as executive editor. During those years, he made sure the magazine kept its anti-communist stance.

Personal life and death
Schulz married Lynne Canwell. They had four sons: William, Max, Nick, and Ken.

Schulz died on July 22, 2019, in Washington, D.C., at age 80.

References

External links

1939 births
2019 deaths
Journalists from New York City
The Bronx High School of Science alumni
Antioch College alumni
American male journalists
20th-century American journalists
21st-century American journalists
Reader's Digest